Walulis (stylized in uppercase in its logo) is a german satirical program that criticizes recent trends in the media. The slogan of the show is „WALULIS – die Medikamentenausgabe im Irrenhaus Internet“ (Eng.: "WALULIS – the medicine delivery in the madhouse internet"). It was produced for funk, which is the online offering of ARD and ZDF, until the end of August 2020. Since, it's produced for SWR3. Walulis is a further development of Walulis sieht fern, which ran on EinsPlus.

Origin 
The goal was to reconceptualize the TV format Walulis sieht fern for YouTube. Therefore presenter Philipp Walulis and his team analyzed the functioning of successful YouTube formats in a three-monthly period of development with the title "Make The Internet Great Again". They thought about how they could use this new knowledge in their own format and make the best out of their Television experience and the demands on YouTube videos. This period of development was public and the users were called out to give suggestions and offer criticism.

From the 16th of November 2016 till the 31st of August 2020 Walulis was a part of funk. After that, they changed to their current network SWR3, renamed the show to Walulis Story and created a new channel and video design.

Since September 2019, an additional YouTube channel called Walulis Daily exists, which reminds in the principle of the form of the regular channel Walulis, but releases a video from Monday to Thursday about short-term political subjects (often apart from the media focused content as seen Walulis, see the following paragraph). Since October 2019, the channel releases moreover Friday a longer video with studio audience, which acts as week review under the name Walulis Daily Turbo, which features besides the main subject other – mostly strange – news („Geilmeildung“) and contributions of the community („Retro-Show“). Walulis Daily is still a part of funk.

Since 24th September 2020, the show Walulis Woche is running. It is a weekly review which is uploaded every thursday to the ARD Mediathek with Walulis Story as its last part. Since 1st March 2021, clips of Walulis Woche are also uploaded to the channel WALULIS STORY - SWR3 on YouTube.

Content 
In one videos per week (they produced two and three videos per week for some time), which are released in the funk media library and on YouTube, Walulis discusses monothematicly a media trend and shows the background. The range of topics goes over current TV events, critical inspections of YouTubers and differentiated views of current hypes on the Internet.

Structure 
The videos are always based on an elaborately researched journalistic core, which is packed with humor. The episodes are recorded in a studio with a late-night look, where Philipp Walulis is at his desk. The usual coffee cup at Walulis has the shape of poop emoji . The videos are interrupted by excerpts from other broadcasts and small game sequences. Other members of the team can be seen in the game sequences, for example "the Assi". Each episode also contains some of the following fixed elements:

However, there are also videos that deviate from this format. The series "Warum eigentlich?" (eng. Why is this actually?) dispenses with the elements mentioned above. Instead, these are shorter animated videos, which are synchronized by Walulis. They always get to the bottom of a specific question about media (e.g. "Why is there still Teletext?"). This is contrasted by the "Community Service", which appears once a month and extends the standard format of the channel. Walulis is supported by a member of the team as a co-moderator. Contributions from the community are also woven into the actual topic of the episode: For example, user comments from the previous month are selected according to often arbitrary categories, viewer questions are answered and a viewer's YouTube channel is “honored” with a subscription by the Walulis channel.

Since the start of the sister channel, Walulis Daily, some of the above-mentioned figures and elements - such as the Assi, the homeless person and the Birnbaum Institute - have disappeared, and the various authors and editors of the show appear primarily as themselves in the recordings.

Success 
The channel now earns over 3,5 million views per month. The videos are often in the trends of YouTube. The channel was rewarded from the journal Quotenmeter with the television prize in the category "Bester Web-Channel" (eng. best web channel).

External links 

 
 Website at funk

References 

Current affairs shows
German web series
YouTube original programming
Comedy web series